John Valentine Ellis (14 February 1835 – 10 July 1913) was a Canadian journalist and parliamentarian. He was first elected to the House of Commons of Canada in the 1887 general election as a Liberal Member of Parliament representing the New Brunswick electoral district of City of St. John. Although defeated in 1891, he was re-elected in the 1896 election.  On 3 September 1900, he was appointed to the Senate of Canada on the recommendation of Sir Wilfrid Laurier. He represented the senatorial division of Saint John, New Brunswick until his death in Saint John on 10 July 1913.

References

External links
 

1835 births
1913 deaths
Canadian senators from New Brunswick
Journalists from New Brunswick
Liberal Party of Canada MPs
Liberal Party of Canada senators
Members of the House of Commons of Canada from New Brunswick